Qian shi may refer to:

Euryale ferox (pinyin: qiàn shí), a plant in the Nymphaeaceae (water lily) family
Qiàn shí, the Chinese name for Euryale ferox or fox nut
Qin Shi Huang (259 BC–210 BC), founder of the Qin dynasty
Qianshi hutong, a Beijing alleyway
Qianshi Quantum Computer the 10 qubit Quantum Computer from Baidu.

See also
Qian Shizhen (1561–1642), Ming dynasty general
Shi Qian (时迁), a character in the epic Chinese tale, the Water Margin